Oplany is a municipality and village in Prague-East District in the Central Bohemian Region of the Czech Republic. It has about 100 inhabitants.

History
The first written mention of Oplany is from 1379.

Gallery

References

Villages in Prague-East District